M/S Skane as Swedish Skåne is a Swedish passenger ferry in operation between Trelleborg in Scania, Sweden and Rostock in Mecklenburg, Germany. The world's largest multi-purpose ro-ro/train ferry, it is owned by the Stena Line, and operated by Scandlines. The ship was built in 1997-98 by Astilleros Españoles of Spain. It is named for the southern Swedish province of Skåne, called "Scania" in English.

Ship details
Skane was built at the Astilleros Españoles shipyard in Puerto Real, Spain, and launched on 9 August 1997. The ship has 3,295 lane meters for road vehicles and another 1,110 lane meters for rolling stock, which give it a capacity of up to 2,630 tonnes of road vehicles and 3,330 tonnes of railway stock. It has accommodation for up to 600 passengers in 150 cabins. Delivered on 22 June 1998, she currently sails between Sweden and Germany. MS Skåne is designed by Naval Architect Knud E. Hansen A/S in Denmark.

References

External links

1997 ships
Ferries of Sweden
Ships built in Spain